Barn Rock is a prominent rock, more than  high, near the north end of the Terra Firma Islands in Marguerite Bay. It was first visited and surveyed in 1936 by the British Graham Land Expedition under John Rymill, and resurveyed in 1948 by the Falkland Islands Dependencies Survey who so named the rock because of its appearance when seen from the west.

References
 

Rock formations of Graham Land
Fallières Coast